

First round

Second round

Semifinals

Pool A 

Stadoceste Tarbais qualified to final

Pool B 

Racing Paris qualified for final

The final

Notes 

1913,1914
Championship
France